HMS Durban was a  light cruiser of the Royal Navy. She was launched from the yards of Scotts Shipbuilding and Engineering Company on 29 May 1919 and commissioned on 1 November 1921.

Early career
Durban was initially assigned to the China Station as part of the 5th Light Cruiser Squadron in January 1922, and in 1928 she was transferred to the America and West Indies Station based at the Royal Naval Dockyard at Bermuda, with Prince George, Duke of Kent, the fourth son of King George V and Queen Mary, serving aboard as a watch-keeping Lieutenant. In 1930 Durban returned to Britain, and in 1931 she joined the South Atlantic Division. By December 1933, she was relieved by the heavy cruiser  and again returned to home waters. In March 1934, Durban left for Gibraltar to join the Mediterranean Fleet. She spent two years on this station, returning to Britain in September 1936 to be placed into reserve.

Wartime service
On the outbreak of the Second World War in September 1939, Durban was recommissioned and assigned to the 9th Cruiser Squadron under the Commander-in-Chief, South Atlantic. In March 1940 she was operating in the Indian Ocean and was then transferred to the Eastern Fleet based at Singapore. The unit kept watch on German merchant ships in the Dutch East Indies harbours, with Durbans patrol area being off Padang. On 10 November 1940 the Norwegian tanker Ole Jacob reported being attacked by the German raider  between Ceylon, and the north end of Sumatra. A force was hastily assembled, comprising Durban, the cruiser  and the Australian cruiser  and armed merchant cruiser  to hunt for Atlantis. The task force was however unable to locate the raider.

In 1941 Durban, with her sister , was escorting convoys between Singapore and the Sunda Strait. In February, she escorted the ocean liner , then carrying Second Australian Imperial Force troops for Malaya, into Singapore, arriving on 18 February. In November, she escorted the troopship Zealandia into Singapore, after relieving the Australian cruiser  which had escorted Zealandia from Fremantle, Western Australia.

In February 1942 Durban moved with the rest of the Eastern Fleet to Java, after the Japanese started their attack on Singapore. Durban was damaged by bombing before she could leave, but on 12 February she and the anti-submarine vessel  escorted the merchant ships  and  out of Singapore, repelling successive Japanese air attacks for four hours. The next day the convoy, carrying thousands of evacuees from Singapore, reached Tandjong Priok, the port for Batavia. Durban, with Admiral Thomas C. Hart as a passenger, departed 16 February escorting  carrying refugees to Colombo. There Durban underwent temporary repairs. She then travelled to New York, arriving in April, where full repairs were completed. Durban then returned to Britain, where further modifications were made in Portsmouth between June and August. She then escorted convoys from Britain to South Africa.

On 8 December 1942 the ship grounded in the entrance to Mombasa harbour. After refloating she was drydocked in Bombay. In February 1943 Durban was again in New York for repairs, and by June had returned to South Africa, docking at Simonstown, before rejoining the Eastern Fleet. In November, she once again returned to Britain to be paid off into the reserve. She was then one of the ships selected to be scuttled to form a breakwater for the Mulberry harbours that would be used to support the Battle of Normandy.

Subsequently, on 9 June 1944 Durban was scuttled to form part of the Gooseberry 5 breakwater for protecting the artificial harbour off Ouistreham in the Seine Bay.

Notes

References

External links

 Ships of the Danae class

 

Danae-class cruisers of the Royal Navy
Ships built on the River Clyde
Ships built in Plymouth, Devon
1919 ships
World War II naval ships of the United Kingdom
World War II shipwrecks in the Atlantic Ocean
World War II cruisers of the United Kingdom
Scuttled vessels of the United Kingdom
Maritime incidents in June 1944
Ships sunk as breakwaters